Trent Bushey (born June 23, 1964, different  in Haverhill, Massachusetts) is an American actor.  He is a theatre-trained actor best known for playing David Rampal, half of the popular young couple of David & Melanie on the television soap opera All My Children.

Filmography
All My Children - David Rampal (1988–1991)
American Shaolin: King of the Kickboxers II (1992) – Trevor Gottital
As the World Turns - Evan Walsh (1995)

External links

1964 births
Living people
American male soap opera actors
People from Haverhill, Massachusetts